Jules Olivier Koundé (born 12 November 1998) is a French professional footballer who plays as a centre-back or right-back for La Liga club Barcelona and the France national team.

Club career

Bordeaux

Koundé started in his first team debut for Bordeaux in the 2–1 Coupe de France away loss to US Granville in the round of 64 on 7 January 2018, playing the full 90 minutes of normal time and the full 30 minutes of extra time. He started in his Ligue 1 debut for Bordeaux in a 1–0 away win over Troyes on 13 January 2018. On 10 February 2018, Koundé scored the opening goal of a 3–2 Ligue 1 home win over Amiens; it was his first career Ligue 1 goal and his first competitive goal for Bordeaux's first team.

Sevilla
On 3 July 2019, he signed for Spanish club Sevilla. The transfer fee paid to Bordeaux was reported as €25 million. In his first season at Sevilla, he helped the club win the UEFA Europa League for a record sixth time and was named in the competition's team of the season.

Barcelona
On 29 July 2022, Barcelona announced an agreement with Sevilla for the transfer of Koundé. Koundé missed Barcelona's first match of the La Liga season  against Rayo Vallecano as the club could not register him as they were over the league's salary cap limit. He also missed Barcelona's second league match against Real Sociedad on 21 August for the same reason. Kounde was registered with La Liga on 26 August and made his official debut for the club two days later in a 4–0 win over Real Valladolid at the Camp Nou.

International career
On 18 May 2021, Koundé was selected by Didier Deschamps as part of the 26 players that formed the France national team for UEFA Euro 2020. He made his debut on 2 June 2021 in a friendly against Wales, substituting Benjamin Pavard at half-time.

On 10 October 2021, Koundé started in France's win over Spain in the 2021 UEFA Nations League Final.

Personal life
Koundé is half Beninese and half French.

Career statistics

Club

International

Honours
Sevilla
UEFA Europa League: 2019–20

Barcelona
Supercopa de España: 2022–23

France
UEFA Nations League: 2020–21
FIFA World Cup runner-up: 2022

Individual
UEFA Europa League Squad of the Season: 2019–20
La Liga Team of the Season: 2021–22

References

External links

Profile at the FC Barcelona website

1998 births
Living people
Footballers from Paris
French footballers
Association football defenders
FC Girondins de Bordeaux players
Sevilla FC players
FC Barcelona players
Ligue 1 players
La Liga players
UEFA Europa League winning players
France youth international footballers
France under-21 international footballers
France international footballers
UEFA Euro 2020 players
2022 FIFA World Cup players
UEFA Nations League-winning players
French expatriate footballers
Expatriate footballers in Spain
French expatriate sportspeople in Spain
Black French sportspeople
French sportspeople of Beninese descent